C. ciliata  may refer to:
 Cassia ciliata, a synonym for Senna occidentalis, a pantropical plant species
 Corythucha ciliata, the sycamore lace bug, an insect species found in Europe

See also
 Ciliata (disambiguation)